Ahmed ben Arous, full name: Abu al-Abbas Ahmed Ben Abdallah ben Abu Bakr al-Houari, ; (c. 1376–21 October 1436) was a Tunisian Wali, religious leader and founder of the Arousia Tariqa.

Life
He was born in Tunis, to a father from the Houara tribe and a mother originally from Misrata, and was a follower of the Zawiya of Sidi Mahrez. He later went to Morocco where he studied in Fes and Marrakesh. Upon his return to Tunis, he lived in seclusion for a while then worked as carpenter. His Tariqa was influenced by the Shadhili order. He was known for his sympathy for the poor, the strangers and the animals. His teachings were revived by his disciple Abdessalam al-Asmar and an extended biography of him was written by Omar al-Jazairi.

References

Berber Tunisians
People from Tunis
Tunisian religious leaders
15th-century people of Ifriqiya
14th-century people of Ifriqiya
Tunisian Sufis
Tunisian people of Libyan descent
Tunisian expatriates in Morocco
University of al-Qarawiyyin alumni
1376 births
1436 deaths